Tom Rodgers was a mountain bike racer who was 21 years old when he was killed in a car crash on 14 January 2009. He was driving a Peugeot 306 which crashed into a wall and tree. He won in the Seniors category at the 2006 English DH Championships and the 2007 Senior English Champion. A Memorial Fund was set up for Rodgers and co-driver Ben Ineson to develop and help young riders in their DH (downhillers) riding. Known as the Ride in Peace Charity, it is coached by Ben Deakin with the assistance from the Pro Ride Guides Rodgers rode for All Terrain Cycles in the elite division and was said to have "forged the team’s success."

References

2009 deaths
English mountain bikers